Atractogyne is a genus of flowering plants in the family Rubiaceae. It is found in western and western-central tropical Africa.

Species 
Two species are currently recognised:

Atractogyne bracteata (Wernham) Hutch. & Dalziel - Ghana, Côte d'Ivoire, Nigeria, Central African Republic, Cameroon, Gabon 
Atractogyne gabonii Pierre - Central African Republic, Cameroon, Gabon, Congo-Brazzaville, Congo-Kinshasa (Zaire)

References

External links 
 Atractogyne in the World Checklist of Rubiaceae

Rubiaceae genera
Sherbournieae